Flint Central High School was one of the Flint Community Schools, located in Flint, Michigan, USA. Flint Central was the city's oldest school. Its first building was built in 1875, and the school moved into the present building in 1923. It was called Flint High School until Flint Northern High School was built in around 1928.  Approximately 2,000 students attended the school at its peak attendance, and about half that at the time of its closing. Graduation ceremonies were held at Whiting Auditorium. The school building is located in the East Village, near the corner of Crapo Street and Court Street.

History 
In April 2009 the Board of Education voted to close the school due to declining enrollment and maintenance costs.  As Central High School is one of the oldest buildings in the district, it was cited as costly to maintain and renovate.  Several other schools in the district were closed as well, all of which were elementary schools.

The last day of classes at Flint Central High School was on June 11, 2009. The following day, a farewell ceremony was held at the school for alumni to walk the halls one last time. The building has been closed indefinitely, which was met with great backlash from the current students, parents and alumni. At the time of the closure, the Flint Schools put out a statement saying that Central could re-open in five years with several renovations. That, however, was deemed untrue as the Flint Schools cannot afford to re-open Central, and due to declining enrollment district-wide, the FCS has also closed Flint Northern High School in 2013.

City planners have drafted long-term plans to consolidate Flint's high schools into a new high school at the existing Flint Central location.

Athletics
Flint Central competed in the oldest athletic conference in the State of Michigan, the Saginaw Valley League.  The football teams played their home games at Atwood Stadium in Flint. On certain nights when Atwood was already in use (also the home of Flint Northern and Flint Southwestern), Flint Central would host at their secondary home, Guy V. Houston Stadium, located near Flint Northwestern.

 Men's basketball
 Baseball
 Bowling
 Men's swimming
 Women's volleyball
 Men's wrestling
 Women's basketball
 Cross country
 Men's football
 Women's golf
 Men's golf
 Women's Soccer
 Men's Soccer
 Women's Softball
 Women's Swimming
 Tennis
 Track and field
 Cheerleading

Athletic history 
From 1976 through 2001 the school's football coach was Joe Eufinger. His lifetime record was 138–102, which is the ninth-highest win total amongst coaches in Genesee County.  Longtime Baseball coach Bob Holec is now leading the Flint Baseball Commission and is the Commissioner of the baseball contingent for the CANUSA Games. The Men's Basketball team was coached for many years by Stan Gooch. They won state championships in 1981, 1982 and 1983. He won over 500 games and is in numerous Halls of Fame. The softball team was led by Cuban refugee Margarita Calvo to an unprecedented 22 consecutive City League titles. The Flint Central tennis team won their first City Championship in more than seven years in spring of 2007, and still maintained their position until the school was closed. Clem Rowe was the longtime Tennis Coach at the school. After years of struggling, the baseball team rebounded with a 15-win season in 2007, claiming the city series title, as well as runner up in the annual Greater Flint Tournament.

Mascot change 
The mascot of Flint Central High School since 1928 was the Indian.  In 2001 the Flint Board of Education voted to phase out school mascots that made reference to Native Americans in all of Flint's schools. This affected other school mascots as well including the Pierce Elementary School Arrows (although the mascot name is a reference to the automobile model, not the weapon), and the Whittier Middle School Braves. The changeover was completed for the 2005-2006 school year.

Theater program
The Magnet Program for the Flint Community Schools ran the secondary school Theatre Program through Flint Central from 1976-2006. Prior to that Flint Central was long known as a leader in educational theatre locally, statewide and nationally. The program was led for many years by such notable teachers as Helen Hardy Brown, Maude Biegel, Jacqueline Oriet Kramer, Shirley Parola, James Olson, Jeanne Shoemaker, Clare Johnson/Swanson and The Most notable and longest in the position was Martin W. Jennings who led the program from 1981-2006. It was during this time Central High School's Theatre program involved over 10,000 students for 25 years from all four of Flint's Comprehensive High Schools. From 1981 to 2006, over 127 full-scale theatre productions were staged including Broadway Musicals, Comedies, Dramas, One-Acts, Student Written Works, The Vehicle City, Improv Troupe and 10 works of William Shakespeare.

The program generally produced three productions every year, in addition to a magnet student showcase which raised thousands of dollars for a fine arts scholarship in the name of Donn Jensen, a supporter of the program who died in 1997. The theatre students of Flint Central have performed internationally and in numerous states. In 1989 and 1991, The Educational Theatre Association named Flint Central's Theatre Program as one of the top six high school theatre programs in the country. The theatre has also had an affiliated membership with The International Thespian Society (Troupe #575) since 1925. Many Alumni have gone on to have careers in the theatre. After changes made by the school board in 2006 to reform the school district, the magnet program was dissolved. In the fall of 2006, Rhonda Young was named director of the theatre program.  Gina Morris Cicalo, longtime director of Whittier Theatre Magnet Program, was appointed theatre teacher at Flint Central for the 2008-09 school year.  During her time at Central, theatre productions were not able to be staged due to facility-damage in the auditorium and scene shop.

The school’s theater program was featured on the Disney+ series Encore! when the reuniting alumni recreated their 1992 production of The Sound of Music.

Notable alumni

Jim Abbott, Class of 1985 – professional baseball player 1989-99, pitched no-hitter for New York Yankees; 1988 Olympic gold medalist; distinguishing characteristic was that he was born with only one hand.
Jim Ananich, Class of 1994 – American Politician, graduate of Michigan State University
David W. Blight, Class of 1967 – Pulitzer Prize-winning Professor of History at Yale University, Director of the Gilder Lehrman Center for the Study of Slavery, Resistance, and Abolition.
Tony Branoff, Class of 1952 – All-State football player, 1953 MVP of University of Michigan football team
Lloyd Brazil, Class of 1925 – All-American halfback for University of Detroit, 1927–1929
Lynn Chandnois, Class of 1943 – first-round draft pick of NFL's Pittsburgh Steelers, All American in college football at Michigan State University
Don Coleman, Class of 1949 – All-American and first Michigan State University football player to have jersey retired; educator, former MSU Dean of Students
Marty Embry, Class of 1982 – won back-to-back State Champion titles with Central, played at DePaul University, drafted by Utah Jazz in 1986 and played 13 years overseas.
Amir Mirza Hekmati, Class of 2001 – arrested by Iran on charges of spying on behalf of Central Intelligence Agency
George Hoey, Class of 1965 – All-State football player, running back for University of Michigan and NFL's Arizona Cardinals, New England Patriots, San Diego Chargers, Denver Broncos, and New York Jets
Dale Jensen, Class of 1952-Member of 1957 Michigan NCAA Tennis Championship Team
Clarence (Kelly) Johnson, Class of 1928 – famous aerospace engineer, formed Skunk Works for Lockheed Aircraft in Burbank, California; designed aircraft such as SR-71 Blackbird, U-2 Spy plane, Lockheed Electra, P-38 Lightning, F-117A Nighthawk (stealth fighter), F-104 Starfighter, T-33 Trainer, and C-130 Hercules transport.
LaKisha Jones, Class of 1998 – American Idol finalist
Craig Menear, class of 1975 - chairman and CEO of The Home Depot
Ron Pruitt,  Class of 1968 – professional baseball player for nine seasons
Donald Riegle, Class of 1956 – United States Senator 1976–1995
Jamarko Simmons, Class of 2004 – All-State football player, wide receiver for Western Michigan University; school leader all-time receptions; signed as undrafted free agent with Green Bay Packers; won Arena Football League championship with Jacksonville Sharks and United Football League championship with Virginia Destroyers.
Antwaun Stanley, Class of 2005 - R&B singer and songwriter. 
Bernice Steadman, Class of 1943 - Aviator and Astronaut of Mercury 13 Space Program
Eric Turner, Class of 1981 - runner-up "Mr. Basketball", played at University of Michigan
Dayne Walling, Class of 1992 - American Politician, mayor of Flint, MI 2009-2015
Coquese Washington, Class of 1989 – basketball player in WNBA after playing at Notre Dame University; first President of WNBA Player Association; presently women's head basketball coach at Penn State University.
Herb Washington, Class of 1968 – world record holder 60-yard dash and 300-yard dash; played professional baseball for Oakland Athletics
Andre Weathers, Class of 1994 – professional football player with New York Giants; played in Super Bowl in 2001; won national championship in 1997 playing for University of Michigan.

References

External links
 

 

Educational institutions established in 1875
High schools in Flint, Michigan
Educational institutions disestablished in 2009
Defunct schools in Michigan
1875 establishments in Michigan